Jan Weissenbruch (1822, The Hague – 1880, The Hague) was a 19th-century Dutch painter.

Biography
According to the RKD he was the cousin of Jan Hendrik Weissenbruch and the older brother of the painters Isaac and Frederik Hendrik and like them studied at the Royal Academy of Art in The Hague. In 1846 he spent a year at the Koninklijke Academie voor Beeldende Kunsten in Amsterdam. He was a pupil of Isaac Cornelis Elink Sterk, Georg Christiaan Heinrich Hessler, Cornelis Steffelaar, Salomon Verveer, and Anthonie Waldorp. He is known as one of the founders of the Pulchri Studio and made watercolors, etchings and woodcuts as well as paintings, mostly of cityscapes and church interiors. In 1857 he won his first golden medal at an exhibition in the Hague. In the late 1860s he began to restore paintings, possibly because he suffered from agoraphobia, which hindered him in the last decade of his life. Johannes Huygens was his pupil.

References

Jan Weissenbruch on Artnet

1822 births
1880 deaths
19th-century Dutch painters
Dutch male painters
Artists from The Hague
19th-century Dutch male artists